Nikola Vasiljević (born 30 June 1991) is a Serbian footballer who plays as a defender for Kolubara

Club career

Kolubara
He made his debut for Kolubara in the Serbian First League at the age of 17. In season 2009–10 he played in 1 away match, versus Sloga Kraljevo. In season 2009–10 he played in 10 league matches. In 2010–11 season, he played in 21 league matches and scored 3 goals, but played just one cup match for this season, without goals. For first half of the season 2011–12 he played in 17 league matches and 1 cup match for Kolubara. Later, he moved to OFK Beograd.

OFK Beograd
He joined the OFK Beograd at the beginning of 2012. In the second half of the 2011–12 season he played in 12 league matches. For season 2012–13 he played in 21 league matches and 3 cup matches. He scored 1 goal against Sloboda Užice. In some matches he played in different positions, but he can play in all positions in defense. After former captain Marko Petković left for Red Star Belgrade, he became captain of OFK Beograd. He played in a total of 30 matches in the season and also played in 4 cup matches.

Pandurii Târgu Jiu
Vasiljević signed a contract with the Romanian club Pandurii Târgu Jiu for two and a half years on 21 January 2015.

Career statistics

Honours
BATE Borisov
Belarusian Premier League: 2018

References

External links
 
 

 Nikola Vasiljević stats at utakmica.rs

1991 births
Living people
Serbian footballers
Association football defenders
Serbian expatriate footballers
Expatriate footballers in Romania
Expatriate footballers in Japan
Expatriate footballers in Belarus
Serbian expatriate sportspeople in Romania
Serbian SuperLiga players
Liga I players
FK Kolubara players
OFK Beograd players
CS Pandurii Târgu Jiu players
Tokushima Vortis players
FC BATE Borisov players